Romanogobio amplexilabris is a species of cyprinid fish endemic to China.

References

Romanogobio
Fish described in 1973
Taxa named by Petre Mihai Bănărescu
Taxa named by Teodor T. Nalbant